TGT was an American supergroup that consisted of R&B singers Tyrese (Tyrese Gibson), Ginuwine (Elgin Baylor Lumpkin) and Tank (Durrell Babbs). TGT is named after the first letter of each of the trio's stage names (T for Tyrese, G for Ginuwine, and T for Tank). The three are close friends and Tyrese was best man at Ginuwine's wedding, but TGT represented their first collaboration. Despite being together as a super group since its formation in 2007, it released its debut album only in August 2013 titled Three Kings on Atlantic Records.

Beginnings
Their first song in 2007 was a remix of Tank's "Please Don't Go" released as "Please Don't Go (The TGT Remix)". The trio also appeared on Slim Thug's single "Let Me Grind".

In an interview, Tyrese said the group would be the "ultimate R&B fan experience. Me, Tank and Ginuwine been talking about this forever. The reason why this makes sense is that besides all of us being R&B singers, we're all good friends. Every time I see Tank, every time I see Ginuwine, we all had good energy regardless."

The trio planned the Shirts Off Tour for late 2007, with Avant as an opening act. As part of the tour, they planned to hold auditions for a fourth member of the group. The tour faced delays, however, and was anticipated for early 2008.

The group faced difficulties given that each member of the trio is signed to a different record label, and on August 21, 2008, Ginuwine announced on his MySpace blog that due to label and legal issues they will not be able to release an official TGT album at the moment.

Comeback
On September 22, 2012, Tyrese revealed on his Twitter page that the group has been officially signed to Atlantic Records. Although together on and off for many years, TGT released their debut album Three Kings on August 20, 2013, under Atlantic Records.

Discography

Studio albums

Singles

Awards/nominations
Grammy Awards
2014, Best R&B Album: "Three Kings" (Nominated)
Soul Train Awards
2013, New Artist of the Year: "TGT" (Nominated)
BET Awards
2014, Best Group: "TGT" (Nominated)

References

Contemporary R&B supergroups
Musical groups established in 2007
2007 establishments in the United States
American musical trios
American contemporary R&B musical groups
Atlantic Records artists